Lippe is a district in present-day Germany.

Lippe may also refer to:

 Principality of Lippe, historical state in Germany
 Free State of Lippe, historical state in Germany
 Lippe (surname)
 Lippe (river)
 Lippe (department)
 House of Lippe
 Lippe Uplands
 Lippe, Indiana, a community in the United States